The Ice Hockey Association of the DPR Korea is the governing body of ice hockey in North Korea.

See also

North Korea men's national ice hockey team
North Korea women's national ice hockey team

References

External links
DPR Korea at IIHF.com

Korea Dpr
Korea
Sports governing bodies in North Korea
 
Sports organizations established in 1963
1963 establishments in North Korea